Sadeh or Sadhe was an ancient Egyptian queen consort, a lower ranking wife of Pharaoh Mentuhotep II of the 11th Dynasty. Her tomb (DBXI.7) and small decorated chapel were found in her husband's Deir el-Bahari temple complex, behind the main building, along with the tombs of five other women, Ashayet, Henhenet, Kawit, Kemsit and Mayet. She and three other women of the six bore queenly titles, and most of them were priestesses of Hathor, so it is possible that they were buried there as part of the goddess's cult, but it is also possible that they were the daughters of nobles the king wanted to keep an eye upon.

Her titles were: King's Beloved Wife (ḥmt-nỉswt mrỉỉ.t=f ), King's Sole Ornament (ẖkr.t-nỉswt wˁtỉ.t), Priestess of Hathor (ḥm.t-nṯr ḥwt-ḥrw).

Sources

21st-century BC Egyptian people
21st-century BC women
Queens consort of the Eleventh Dynasty of Egypt
Mentuhotep II
Hathor